Live Bait, Vol. 04 - Past Summers is a live download by band Phish. The song selection was compiled by Phish archivist Kevin Shapiro, and was released May 2011. This download features highlights from previous summer tours, and was released shortly before Phish's 2011 summer tour. It was available for free on the official Phish website for a short time. It is now available for purchase from Phish's LivePhish website.

Track listing 
 "Scent Of A Mule" (Gordon) - 12:05 (1996-06-06 Joyous Lake - Woodstock, NY)
 Contains an instrumental tease of Sunshine of Your Love by Cream
 "You Enjoy Myself" (Anastasio) - 25:00 (1999-07-15 PNC Bank Arts Center - Holmdel, NJ)
 "The Landlady > Tweezer" (Anastasio; Anastasio, Fishman, Gordon, McConnell) - 16:27 (1993-08-12 Meadow Brook Music Festival - Rochester Hills, MI)
 "Mike's Song > Contact > Weekapaug Groove" (Anastasio, Fishman, Gordon, McConnell) - 36:46 (1995-06-20 Blossom Music Center - Cuyahoga Falls, OH)
 "Split Open And Melt" (Anastasio) - 15:10 (1994-06-21 Cincinnati Music Hall - Cincinnati, OH)
 "N02" (Gordon) - 5:36 (1999-07-13 Tweeter Center aka Great Woods - Mansfield, MA)
 "My Friend My Friend > McGrupp And The Watchful Hosemasters" (Anastasio, Marshall) - 17:54 (1993-08-07 Darien Lakes Performing Arts Center - Darien Center, NY)
 "Twist > Slave To The Traffic Light" (Anastasio, Marshall; Abrahams, Anastasio, Marshall, Pollak) - 29:50 (2000-07-04 E Centre - Camden, NJ)
 "Free > What's The Use" (Anastasio, Marshall; Anastasio, Fishman, Gordon, McConnell) - 19:27 (1999-07-09 Merriweather Post Pavilion - Columbia, MD)
 "Axilla > My Sweet One > Run Like An Antelope" (Anastasio, Marshall; Fishman; Anastasio, Herman, Marshall, Pollak) - 17:38 (1993-07-28 Grady Cole Center - Charlotte, NC)
 "David Bowie > Catapult > David Bowie " (Anastasio; Gordon) - 13:12 (1994-06-29 Walnut Creek Amphitheater - Raleigh, NC)
 "Divided Sky" (Anastasio) - 15:28 (1997-08-02 Gorge Amphitheatre - George, WA)

External links 
 Phish.com - Official Site
 LivePhish.com - Live Bait Vol. 04

2011 live albums
Phish live albums
LivePhish.com Downloads